K-9 is a  state highway in the U.S. state of Kansas. The highway goes east–west through Kansas. It has its western terminus south of Dresden at an intersection with K-123 and an eastern terminus at its junction with U.S. Route 73 near Lancaster. K-9 is the second longest state highway after K-4.

Route description

K-9 begins south of Dresden at K-123 on the border between Sheridan and Decatur counties. After starting out along the border, it gradually follows an east-northeast alignment, as the highway parallels the north fork of the Solomon River. After passing through Lenora, K-9 has a short overlap with US-283. It passes through Edmond and intersects K-173 near Densmore, then continues east through Logan and Speed. At Glade, K-9 intersects US-183. East of Glade, K-9 follows an east-southeast trajectory which goes north of Kirwin, then goes through Cedar and Gaylord before intersecting US-281. K-9 then goes southeast through Portis with US-281, then turns south. At US-24, K-9 turns east with US-24, ending its overlap with US-281.

K-9 and US-24 then overlap eastward through Downs, where they intersect K-181. The overlap continues through Cawker City and then intersects K-128. After passing through Glen Elder and Solomon Rapids. K-9 and US-24 intersect K-14 at Beloit, then the overlap ends shortly after that intersection.  K-9 continues east from Beloit, then follows alternating northerly and easterly alignments before intersecting K-28 west of Concordia.  It turns east into Concordia and intersects US-81 there.

Going east from Concordia, K-9 goes east to Clyde and Clifton, then intersects K-15.  K-9 and K-15 then overlap, intersecting K-115 near Palmer and passing through Linn before meetin K-148.  K-9 and K-148 then overlap going east, intersecting K-119 near Greenleaf, before ending their overlap at Barnes.  It continues east to Waterville, where it begins an overlap with US-77, and the overlap with US-77 continues east to Blue Rapids.

From Blue Rapids, K-9 continues east to Frankfort, where it intersects K-99.  They overlap going north from Frankfort, then K-9 turns east and intersects K-87 near Vliets, K-88 near Vermillion and K-187 at Centralia.  East of Centralia, K-9 intersects K-63, and they overlap going south into Corning.  K-9 then turns east at Corning, and then intersects K-62 southwest of Goff.  It goes northeast into Goff, then goes southeasterly through Wetmore before intersecting US-75 near Netawaka.

K-9 continues southeast through Netawaka, then turns east through Whiting.  Near Muscotah, K-9 intersects US-159, then they turn south together through Muscotah.  They then overlap going east, then south into Effingham.  East of Effingham, the K-9/US-159 overlap ends, and K-9 alternates between northbound and eastbound alignments on its way towards Lancaster, ending south of Lancaster at US-73.

The Kansas Department of Transportation (KDOT) tracks the traffic levels on its highways, and in 2018, they determined that on average the traffic varied from 170 vehicles per day near the western terminus to 4850 vehicles per day slightly east of US-81. The second highest was 4740 vehicles per day slightly east of K-14. The section of K-9 along the overlap with US-24 and the overlap with US-77 is included in the National Highway System. The National Highway System is a system of highways important to the nation's defense, economy, and mobility. K-9 also connects to the National Highway System at its junction with US-183 in Glade, US-81 in Concordia, and US-75 in Netawaka. All but  of K-9's alignment is maintained by KDOT. The entire  section within Concordia is maintained by the city. The entire  section within Clyde is maintained by the city. The entire  section within Clifton is maintained by the city.

History
K-9 originally began at US-383 but was realigned sometime between 1941 and 1956 to start at K-123. In a February 27, 1942 resolution, K-9 was realigned to run from Dresden east, then south to the old K-9 alignment in New Almelo. In a December 20, 1950 resolution, K-9 was realigned to go west from Allison to K-123 along the Decatur–Sheridan county line.

K-9 was the Kansas Segment of the Great White Way; one of the first Intra-state highways - Chicago to Colorado Springs, Colorado. The name came from white limestone gravel making it an all-weather road. It ran alongside railroad routes much of the way with every other telegraph or telephone pole bearing a painted white stripe assuring motorists they were on the right road. Worth a Google dive for history buffs (K-9 Kansas Great White Way)

Major intersections

See also

 List of state highways in Kansas

References

External links

 Kansas Department of Transportation State Map
 KDOT: Historic State Maps

009
Transportation in Sheridan County, Kansas
Transportation in Decatur County, Kansas
Transportation in Norton County, Kansas
Transportation in Phillips County, Kansas
Transportation in Smith County, Kansas
Transportation in Osborne County, Kansas
Transportation in Mitchell County, Kansas
Transportation in Cloud County, Kansas
Transportation in Clay County, Kansas
Transportation in Washington County, Kansas
Transportation in Marshall County, Kansas
Transportation in Nemaha County, Kansas
Transportation in Jackson County, Kansas
Transportation in Atchison County, Kansas